Dukes named Stephen include:

 Stephen, Duke of Slavonia (1332–1354), an Angevin prince
 Stephen I, Duke of Bavaria (1271–1310)
 Stephen II, Duke of Bavaria (1319–1375)
 Stephen III, Duke of Bavaria (1337–1413)
 Stjepan Vukčić Kosača (1404–1466), Bosnian nobleman of the House of Kosača